Alfred Krohn (born 2 May 1903, date of death unknown) was a German rower. He competed in the men's coxed four event at the 1928 Summer Olympics.

References

External links
 
 

1903 births
Year of death missing
German male rowers
Olympic rowers of Germany
Rowers at the 1928 Summer Olympics
Sportspeople from Szczecin